Oleksiy Anatoliyovych Hay (born 6 November 1982) is a Ukrainian retired professional footballer
. He is currently an assistant manager at Chornomorets Odesa.

Career
He made a political statement when in 2014 he refused to wear the "Glory to the Ukrainian Army" shirt which was imposed on all football players by the Ukraine Football Association.

On 5 January 2015, Gai signed an 18-month contract with Azerbaijan Premier League side Gabala FK.

On 5 August 2016, Gai signed a two-year contract with Russian National League side Kuban Krasnodar.

Career statistics

Club

International

Honours

Club

Shakhtar Donetsk
 Ukrainian Premier League: 2001–02, 2007–08, 2009–10, 2010–11, 2011–12, 2012–13
 Ukrainian Cup: 2001–02, 2003–04, 2007–08, 2010–11, 2011–12, 2012–13
 UEFA Cup: 2008–09

International

Ukraine U19
 UEFA European Under-19 Championship runner-up: 2000

References

External links
 
 

Official team profile

1982 births
Living people
Footballers from Zaporizhzhia
Ukrainian footballers
Association football midfielders
Ukraine international footballers
Ukraine under-21 international footballers
Ukraine youth international footballers
Ukrainian expatriate footballers
Ukrainian Premier League players
Ukrainian First League players
Ukrainian Second League players
FC Viktor Zaporizhzhia players
FC Metalurh-2 Zaporizhzhia players
FC Shakhtar Donetsk players
FC Shakhtar-2 Donetsk players
FC Shakhtar-3 Donetsk players
UEFA Cup winning players
FC Mariupol players
FC Chornomorets Odesa players
Azerbaijan Premier League players
Gabala FC players
Expatriate footballers in Azerbaijan
Ukrainian expatriate sportspeople in Azerbaijan
FC Kuban Krasnodar players
Expatriate footballers in Russia
Ukrainian expatriate sportspeople in Russia
FC Olimpik Donetsk players